William Pierce Butler (born October 6, 1982) is an American multi-instrumentalist and composer who is best known as a former member of the indie rock band Arcade Fire. He plays synthesizer, bass, guitar and percussion. He is known for his spontaneity and antics during performances. He is the younger brother of Arcade Fire frontman Win Butler. In 2014, Will Butler was nominated for the Academy Award for Best Original Score for his work on the original score of the 2013 film Her.

Life and career
Born in Truckee, California, United States, and raised in The Woodlands, Texas, Will is the son of Liza Rey, a classical musician, and Edwin Farnham Butler II, a geologist. His maternal grandfather was guitarist Alvino Rey. He graduated from Phillips Exeter Academy in 2001, where he lived in Abbot Hall, and subsequently attended Northwestern University, majoring in Poetry and Slavic studies. During this time, he worked as a DJ for the WNUR Rock Show, where he also hired Nathan Amundson of Rivulets to be a substitute DJ at WNUR-FM. He also served as the poetry editor of Northwestern's literary magazine, Helicon. An excerpt of a poem from his senior thesis is quoted in Brian Bouldrey's book, "Honorable Bandit: A Walk Across Corsica." While at Northwestern, Butler lived in Chicago, Illinois. He moved to Montreal, Quebec, Canada in the mid-2000s to join his brother Win Butler and band Arcade Fire.

In January 2008 Butler married dancer Jenny Shore.

In January 2014, Butler and Owen Pallett were nominated for Best Original Score at the 86th Academy Awards for their original score of Her.

Butler was a student at the Harvard Kennedy School of Government where he pursued a Mid-Career Master in Public Administration.

In March 2022, Butler announced he had left Arcade Fire at the end of the previous year, stating "there was no acute reason beyond that I've changed—and the band has changed—over the last almost 20 years. Time for new things." The band's album We, released on May 6, 2022, was Butler's last performance with Arcade Fire on a studio album.

Despite leaving Arcade Fire, Butler does not expect to leave the music scene and has "a few other projects percolating."

Solo career
On March 3, 2015, Butler's debut solo album Policy was released under Merge Records, accompanied by an international tour alongside Arcade Fire drummer Jeremy Gara. According to Butler, Policy is intended to reflect his omnivorous musical taste.

Butler wrote five songs for The Guardian, based on news headlines, with each song created and shared a day apart. They were mixed properly and released on Policy Deluxe in May 2015.

Butler's song "Sun Comes Up" from the 2016 solo album Friday Night caught the ear of DJ B-Roc of The Knocks, and subsequently the Knocks-produced remix of the song was released alongside a video directed by Butler, filmed in part on the New York City subway system.

Butler has written original songs for the new David Adjmi play Stereophonic, scheduled to premiere on Broadway in 2021.

Solo discography

Studio albums 
Policy (Merge Records, 2015)
Friday Night (Merge Records, 2016)
Generations (Merge Records, 2020)

Singles 
 "Anna" (2015)

Music videos 
 "What I Want" (2015)
 "Anna" (2015)

References

1982 births
Living people
Arcade Fire members
Northwestern University alumni
Phillips Exeter Academy alumni
Musicians from Houston
American indie rock musicians
Grammy Award winners
American expatriate musicians in Canada
21st-century American composers
21st-century American bass guitarists
21st-century American double-bassists
21st-century American guitarists
21st-century American keyboardists
American multi-instrumentalists
21st-century American singers
21st-century double-bassists
Harvard Kennedy School alumni
Merge Records artists